Agim Bubeqi (born 7 April 1963) is a retired Albanian footballer who played his entire professional career as a striker for Flamurtari Vlorë.

International career
He made his debut for Albania in an April 1987 Euro Championship qualification match against Austria and earned a total of 6 caps, scoring no goals.

His final international was a November 1989 FIFA World Cup qualification match against Poland.

Personal life
Bubeqi was arrested by police in Vlorë on 16 July 2009 after stabbing a young man to death in front of a bar and injuring four others. It was reported Bubeqi suffered from mental problems after being involved a car accident in August the year before and that he thought the victims were making fun of him.

Honours
Albanian Superliga: 1
 1991

References

External links

1963 births
Living people
Footballers from Vlorë
Albanian footballers
Association football forwards
Albania international footballers
Flamurtari Vlorë players
Kategoria Superiore players